Beaver Township, Kansas may refer to the following places in Kansas:

 Beaver Township, Barton County, Kansas
 Beaver Township, Cowley County, Kansas
 Beaver Township, Decatur County, Kansas
 Beaver Township, Lincoln County, Kansas
 Beaver Township, Phillips County, Kansas
 Beaver Township, Republic County, Kansas
 Beaver Township, Scott County, Kansas
 Beaver Township, Smith County, Kansas

See also 
 List of Kansas townships
 Beaver Township (disambiguation)

Kansas township disambiguation pages